Superstar were a Scottish guitar band founded in 1991.

History
The band was formed in 1991 by Joe McAlinden, a former member of The Groovy Little Numbers and the BMX Bandits, who also arranged strings for the band Teenage Fanclub. They first appeared on Creation Records in 1992 with the album Greatest Hits vol. 1, which was followed by the Capitol Records album Superstar on 28 June 1994. The band regrouped in 1996 and Jim McCulloch, formerly of the Soup Dragons and the original line-up of the BMX Bandits, joined on lead guitar. They signed a deal with the Camp Fabulous label, who issued the 18 Carat album in 1997. Their single "Superstar" reached number 49 in the UK Singles Chart, but gained a wider audience when it was covered by Rod Stewart on When We Were the New Boys.

Discography

Albums
Greatest Hits Volume 1 (UK Creation Records) 1992
Superstar (US Capitol) 1994
18 Carat (UK Camp Fabulous) 1997
Palm Tree (UK Camp Fabulous) 1998
Phat Dat (UK Camp Fabulous) 2000
Six More Songs (UK Camp Fabulous) 2000

EPs
Every Day I Fall Apart EP (UK Camp Fabulous) 1997
Superstar Vs Alan Warner EP, 1998 (a collaboration with author Alan Warner)

Singles
"Breathing Space" (1997), Camp Fabulous - UK No. 66
"Superstar" (1998), Camp Fabulous - UK No. 49
"I Love Love" (2000), Camp Fabulous
"Every Day I Fall Apart" (1997), Camp Fabulous

Line-ups

1992
McAlinden, Nellie Grant, Raymond Prior

1996
McAlinden, Jim McCulloch, drummer Quentin McAfee and bass player Alan Hutchison

References

External links
Joe McAlinden's website
Green Peppers - McCulloch's new band
1998 interview with McAlinden

Creation Records artists
Scottish rock music groups
Musical groups from Glasgow